"Japan" is a song by American rapper Famous Dex. The song, produced by JGramm, was released to streaming services on March 16, 2018. The song peaked at #28 on the Billboard Hot 100.

Background 
“Japan” is the second single from Famous Dex's debut album, Dex Meets Dexter. Famous Dex first premiered the song June 2017 on Instagram. The song gained massive popularity online due to the viral lyric video featuring Famous Dex on green screen visuals, and Internet dance sensation Roy Purdy creating a dance challenge to the song.

Music video 
An animated lyric video by visual artist GOODARTSUCKS was released with the song on March 16, 2018. The video garnered over 20 million views in a month. A music video was released on May 24, 2018, directed by Xavier Andrews.

Charts

Weekly charts

Year-end charts

Certifications

Notes

External links 
 
 

2018 singles
2018 songs
American hip hop songs